Deep in My Heart is a 1999 American drama television film directed by Anita W. Addison, based on a true story. It stars Anne Bancroft and Lynn Whitfield. Bancroft received a Primetime Emmy Award for Outstanding Supporting Actress in a Limited Series or Movie for her role.

Plot
In Boston in the early 1960s, Geraldine Cummins was walking home alone from the movies when she was jumped and raped by a black man. Stunned, she returned home to her husband Bob, stating she had been raped. Sometime later, she finds she is pregnant. She keeps the baby for a few reasons: she is Catholic and she harbors a small hope that it could be her husband's baby. As the baby is a black girl, she fears the social isolation she would receive and what people would think of her. She is heartbroken, but decides to give up her daughter. She names her newborn daughter Barbara Anne Cummins and gives her to foster mother Corrine Burrel, a black woman in Roxbury.

Seven years later, Barbara is a happy little girl. A few months later, a social worker comes into their home and informs Corrine that Barbara will be adopted by Annalise and Paul, white people living in Wisconsin. Corrine seeks legal action, looking to adopt Barbara for herself, but as she is divorced with no job and many children, she is turned down.

Annalise becomes worried about Barbara's very detached nature and suggests to Paul they move to a suburban neighborhood where Barbara could be around other black kids. Paul is angry that they have to change everything for a child he did not want, but agrees, only to leave them after moving. Barbara has once again receded into herself after the neighborhood children make fun of her for being black with a white mother. Over the years until she is 16, she is alone without her mother or friends. At 16 she meets Don, a football-playing choirboy. She falls in love with him and ultimately gets pregnant.

Years later, in the middle of Barbara's third pregnancy, the doctor suggests she look into her birth family history for medical reasons. This leads her in search for her mother. She visits Corrine and later contacts the agency in charge of her adoption. By reading her adoption records, she discovers the truth about her birth and her biological mother. After a night of contemplation, she decides to seek out her birth mother.

Revitalized by the happiness of knowing she was wanted by both her birth mother and foster mother, Barbara reconciles with Annalise. Anxiously, Gerry and her three grown children wait at the airport for Barbara's arrival. Finally, after 34 years, mother and daughter meet. Barbara is angry as to why Gerry gave her up if she loves her, asking if it would have made a difference if she had been born white. Gerry says she only wanted the best for Barbara, to be with people who could teach her courage, which she could not, because Gerry felt ashamed for being raped and having a black daughter, though she loved her. Gerry apologizes to Barbara and they reconcile as mother and daughter. Later, at a family reunion, Corrine, Gerry and Annalise meet again for the first time. The film ends with a picture of the entire side of Barbara's family, her mothers, her uncles, her brothers and sisters, her children, and her nieces and nephews, and Barbara no longer feels alone.

Cast
 Anne Bancroft as Geraldine 'Gerry' Eileen Cummins (Barbara's birth mother)
 Lynn Whitfield as Corrine Burrell (Barbara's foster mother)
 Alice Krige as Annalise Jurgenson (Barbara's adoptive mother)
 Cara Buono as Young Gerry Cummins
 Gloria Reuben as Barbara Ann Williams
 Jesse L. Martin as Don Williams (Barbara's husband)
 Kevin O'Rourke as Robert 'Bob' Cummins
 Albert Schultz as Paul Jurgenson
 Jayne Eastwood as Mrs. Marsdon
 Keenan Macwilliam as Young Barbara Ann
 Philip Akin as Ob-gyn doctor
 Brooke Belvedere as 3-year-old Carol
 Kiel Campbell as 10-year-old Robert
 Michael Capellupo as Ted Cummins
 Mpho Koaho as Roger

External links
 

1999 television films
1999 films
1999 drama films
CBS network films
Films about adoption
Films about dysfunctional families
Films about race and ethnicity
Films about rape
Films set in the 1960s
Films set in the 1970s
Films set in Boston
Films shot in Toronto
American drama television films
Canadian drama television films
1990s English-language films
1990s American films
African-American drama films